Arturo Osornio Sánchez (born 20 February 1953) is a Mexican politician affiliated with the Institutional Revolutionary Party. As of 2014 he served as Deputy of the LIV and LIX Legislatures of the Mexican Congress representing the State of Mexico.

References

1953 births
Living people
Politicians from the State of Mexico
Institutional Revolutionary Party politicians
Deputies of the LIX Legislature of Mexico
Members of the Chamber of Deputies (Mexico) for the State of Mexico